ERp27 (Endoplasmic Reticulum protein 27.7 kDa) is a homologue of PDI (protein disulfide-isomerase), localised to the Endoplasmic Reticulum. The structure of ERp27 has been solved by both X-ray crystallography and NMR spectroscopy, showing it to be composed of two thioredoxin-like domains with homology to the non-catalytic b and b' domains of PDI. The function of ERp27 is unknown, but on the basis of its homology with PDI it is thought to possess chaperone activity.

References

Endoplasmic reticulum resident proteins